Vivek Goel  is the current President and Vice-Chancellor of the University of Waterloo. As a physician and public health researcher, he was also a university administrator, and served as a special advisor to the president and provost of the University of Toronto, and as a professor for the Dalla Lana School of Public Health. 

Goel began his career as an assistant professor with the University of Toronto's Department of Preventive Medicine and Biostatistics, and was later named the chair of the Department of Health Administration. From 1999 to 2001, he served as the Vice-Provost of the Faculty of Medicine, before becoming the Vice-President and Provost of the university from 2004 to 2008. Goel left the University of Toronto, in 2008, to serve as the first president for Public Health Ontario until 2014. Goel returned to the university in 2015 to serve as its Vice-President of Research and Innovation, and Strategic Initiatives, holding the office until 2020. In June 2020, Goel stepped down from his position at the University of Toronto in order to support the Canadian government's COVID-19 Immunity Task Force and the CanCOVID Research Network.

Goel serves on the boards of the Vector Institute, Canada Health Labs (Vice-Chair), the Canadian Institute for Health Information (Vice-Chair) and the POST Promise. He is a Fellow of the Canadian Academy of Health Sciences and a Member of the Order of Canada. On 2 December 2020, Goel was appointed as a Member of the Order of Canada "[f]or his contributions as an academic and administrator who is committed to the advancement of public health services, evidence-based health care and research innovation."

It was announced in November 2020 that Goel would be the seventh President and Vice-Chancellor of the University of Waterloo. He was officially installed on November 8, 2021.

Honours

See also
 List of University of Waterloo people

References

Presidents of the University of Waterloo
Living people
Year of birth missing (living people)
University of Toronto alumni
McGill University Faculty of Medicine alumni
Harvard School of Public Health alumni